The Mole is a British reality game show that aired on Channel 5 from 12 January to 9 December 2001 and is hosted by Glenn Hugill. It is based on the Belgian version of the same name.

Series overview

Locations map

External links
 
 

2001 British television series debuts
2001 British television series endings
2000s British reality television series
British television series based on Dutch television series
Channel 5 (British TV channel) reality television shows
 
Television shows filmed in the United Kingdom
Television shows filmed in France
Television shows filmed in British Columbia